The fisherman's knot is a bend (a knot for joining two lines) with a symmetrical structure consisting of two overhand knots, each tied around the standing part of the other. Other names for the fisherman's knot include: angler's knot, English knot, halibut knot, waterman's knot, and true lovers' knot.

Though the fisherman's knot is associated with fishing, it can slip when tied in nylon monofilament and other slippery lines; however, if more holding strength is required, the overhand knots can be made with more turns, as in the double fisherman's knot, and so on. It is compact, jamming when tightened and the working ends can be cropped very close to the knot. It can also be easily tied with cold, wet hands. Though these properties are well suited to fishing, there are other knots that may provide superior performance, such as the blood knot.

In knitting, the knot is used to join two strands of yarn.  In this context, it is commonly known as "the magic knot".

See also
True lovers' knot
List of bend knots
List of knots

References

Fishing knots
Knots